The 2018 Minnesota Attorney General election was held on November 6, 2018, to elect the attorney general of the U.S. state of Minnesota. A primary election was held on August 14, 2018, in which Doug Wardlow was nominated as the Republican candidate and Keith Ellison was nominated as the Democratic–Farmer–Labor (DFL) candidate. Ellison won the election.

Background
DFL incumbent Lori Swanson was first elected attorney general in 2006. Swanson succeeded two-term DFL incumbent Mike Hatch, who opted to run for governor in 2006. Swanson was re-elected in 2010 and 2014. On January 28, 2018, Swanson announced that she would seek re-election. The announcement came after months of speculation that she would run for governor in 2018. On June 4, 2018, after failing to receive her own party's endorsement for attorney general, Swanson ended her campaign for attorney general and opted to run for governor instead.

Democratic–Farmer–Labor primary

Candidates
 Keith Ellison, Deputy Chair of the Democratic National Committee since 2017; U.S. Representative for Minnesota's 5th congressional district since 2007
 Tom Foley, former Ramsey County attorney
 Debra Hilstrom, member of the Minnesota House of Representatives since 2001; former Anoka County assistant attorney
 Initially withdrew in January 2018 following Swanson's announcement that she would seek re-election. Re-entered the race following Swanson's withdrawal.
 Matt Pelikan, attorney; activist; former clerk for Minnesota Supreme Court Justices Paul Anderson and David Lillehaug
 Mike Rothman, commissioner of the Minnesota Department of Commerce from 2011 to 2017
 Initially withdrew on February 16, 2018, following Swanson's announcement that she would seek re-election. Re-entered the race following Swanson's withdrawal.

It was reported in late January 2018 that Ellison was exploring the possibility of seeking election to be attorney general. According to several people he had spoken with recently, Ellison was not likely to run but found it enticing. Following Swanson's withdrawal from the election on June 4, 2018, it was reported that Ellison was likely to enter the race, which he did the next day.

On June 2, 2018, the DFL endorsed Pelikan at their state convention. Swanson received 52 percent over Pelikan after the first round of balloting, but not the required 60 percent. Swanson then withdrew her nomination for the party's endorsement, but did not indicate if she would run in the primary election.

On June 4, 2018, Swanson announced she would no longer seek re-election and would instead run for Governor. The day after her announcement, Ellison, Foley, Hatch, Hilstrom, and Rothman entered the race. Hatch said he did not think Pelikan had sufficient courtroom experience and would withdraw if someone he thought was qualified entered the race, which he did the next day.

Withdrawn
 Sam Clark, former Saint Paul city attorney; former state director and counsel for U.S. Senator Amy Klobuchar
 Withdrew on January 31, 2018, following Swanson's announcement that she would seek re-election.
 Mike Hatch, attorney general from 1999 to 2007
 Withdrew on June 6, 2018.
 John Lesch, member of the Minnesota House of Representatives since 2003; Saint Paul assistant city attorney
 Withdrew on September 15, 2017, saying he wanted to spend more time with his infant daughter, to help the DFL win control of the Minnesota of House of Representatives, and cited the uncertainty of whether DFL incumbent Lori Swanson would seek re-election.
 Lori Swanson, incumbent since 2007
 Withdrew on June 4, 2018, to seek election to be governor.
 Ryan Winkler, general counsel for Biothera; member of the Minnesota House of Representatives from 2007 to 2015
 Withdrew in January 2018 following Swanson's announcement that she would seek re-election.

Results

Republican primary

Candidates
 Sharon Anderson, perennial candidate
 Bob Lessard, DFL member of the Minnesota Senate from 1977 to 2003
 Doug Wardlow, attorney for the Alliance Defending Freedom; member of the Minnesota House of Representatives from 2011 to 2013

Wardlow was endorsed by the Republicans on June 2, 2018, at their state convention.

Withdrawn
 Harry Niska, attorney; candidate for the Ramsey City Council in 2010
 Withdrew on November 5, 2017, saying campaigning required too much personal life sacrifice.

Results

Minor parties and independents

Candidates
 Noah Johnson (Grassroots—Legalize Cannabis Party), attorney

On October 15, 2018, Grassroots—Legalize Cannabis Party candidate Noah Johnson announced his endorsement of DFL nominee Keith Ellison. In explaining his endorsement, Johnson cited Ellison's recent statement of support for marijuana legalization. Johnson also stated that he wished to avoid drawing votes away from Ellison and thereby increasing Republican nominee Doug Wardlow's chances of victory. Johnson's name remained on the ballot.

General election
On October 27, 2018, Politico reported that the State of Minnesota had not elected a Republican attorney general in more than 40 years, but added that Ellison was "putting that streak to the test." According to Politico, Ellison had been "rocked by accusations of domestic abuse" and had fallen behind Wardlow in a recent poll; Politico added that the race "revolves around Ellison and what voters make of the misconduct allegations he's facing."

Endorsements

Debates
 Complete video of debate at Twin Cities PBS, September 21, 2018

Polling

Results

See also
 2018 Minnesota elections

References

External links
 Elections & Voting - Minnesota Secretary of State

Official campaign websites
Keith Ellison (DFL) for Attorney General
Doug Wardlow (R) for Attorney General

Attorney General
2018
Minnesota